Tetyana Mykhaylivna Reshetnyak (born 29 September 1984), mostly known by her stage name Tayanna, is a Ukrainian singer, actress and composer.

Biography

Early life
Reshetnyak was born in the city of Chernivtsi. At eight years old, her parents urged her to go to a musical school, in the accordion class but she left the school about a year later. Thirteen years later, Tatiana began studying vocals, firstly in the ensemble, and then took individual lessons. In 2001, during a visit to Lviv, Tatyana had the opportunity to perform ensemble before the Pope John Paul II's appearance. The first significant event for her was a trip to Skadovsk for the Black Sea Games festival, where she took the third place. Tatyana has three brothers, two twins who are confectioners, one of them working also as a singer, and Misha Marvin who is singer and well known in Ukraine. Her parents are Natalia and Mikhail.
When Tatyana was 18 years old, she married the famous producer Dmitry Klimashenko.

2008–2011: Hot Chocolate
In 2008, Tatyana became member of the girl group Hot Chocolate (Горячий Шоколад). Three years later, she decided to break up with Dmitry Klimashenko. Dmitry did not accept her decision and he eliminated Tatyana from the girl band forcing her to pay 50,000 $.

2014–2016: The Voice of Ukraine
In 2014, Reshetnyak took part in the fourth season of The Voice of Ukraine (Голос країни) but none of the coaches turned the chair. In the summer of the same year, she released her music video for the song "Znayu i veryu" (Знаю и верю). In 2015, she returned to The Voice of the Ukraine, where she made all coaches to turn their chairs in the blind editions, performing the Ukrainian traditional song "Kray miy ridnyy kray" (Край мій рідний край). Reshetnyak chose Potap as her coach and reached until the final show of the fifth season, where she got the second place losing to Anton Kopitin in the super-final.

2017–present
In 2017, Tayanna competed in the Ukrainian national selection Vidbir 2017 for the Eurovision Song Contest 2017 with the song "I Love You". Although getting the same number of points in total with O.Torvald in the first place, she didn't get enough points by televote and therefore failed to represent Ukraine in the Eurovision 2017.

On 17 November 2017, she released her second album "Trymay mene (Тримай мене)", in collaboration with the producer Alan Badoev. The album consisted of seven tracks in Ukrainian. In December 2017, Tayanna with the song "Skoda (Шкода)" performed in the annual Ukrainian music show M1 Music Awards 2017 and she won the "Proryv (Прорив року)" prize of the year.

In February 2018, Tayanna participated in the Vidbir 2018 with the song "Lelya (Леля)" making her second attempt to represent Ukraine in the Eurovision Song Contest. Although she was a favorite to win, she ended up in the 2nd place losing by only 1 point to Mélovin.

In the spring of 2018, she made her tour in Ukraine. On 19 May 2018, she was invited to attend the ceremony of the Golden Firebird Awards, where she received the "Clip of the Year" and "Singer of the Year" statuettes. On 10 December, she was a special guest in the Woman of the third millennium Awards, where she performed her new single "Fantastychna zhinka (Фантастична жінка)" and received the award in the "Rating" nomination.

In November 2018, Tayanna stated that she would try again to represent Ukraine in the Eurovision Song Contest. On 10 January 2019, she qualified to the semi-finals of Vidbir 2019 with the song "Ochi (Eyes)". On 22 January, Tayanna announced through her social media accounts that she refused to continue in the Ukrainian national selection. On 8 February, she released her song which would compete in the national selection, to represent Ukraine in the Eurovision Song Contest 2019, in Tel Aviv, Israel.

In May 2021, she was announced as the Ukrainian spokesperson for Eurovision Song Contest 2021, reading out the country's jury points in the final.

Discography

Studio albums
 9 песен из жизни ("9 songs of life") (2016)
 Тримай мене ("Hold me") (2017)

EPs
 TAYANNA. Портреты ("Portraits") (2016)

Singles
 "Я или она" ("Me or she") with Lavika (2014)
 "Только Ты" ("Only You") (2014)
 "Самолёты" ("Airplanes") (2014)
 "Обними" ("Hug") (2014)
 "Любви больше нет" ("There is no more love") (2014)
 "Знаю и верю" ("I know and believe") (2014)
 "Забудь" ("Forget") (2014)
 "Если ты ждёшь" ("If you're waiting") (2014)
 "Дышим" ("Breathe") (2014)
 "Pretty Lie" with Lavika (2014)
 "I Am the One" (2014)
 "Да!" ("Yes") (2015)
 "9 жизней" ("9 lives") (2015)
 "Осень" ("Autumn") (2016)
 "I Love You" (2017)
 "Шкода" ("It's a shame") (2017)
 "Квітка" ("Flower") (2017)
 "Леля" ("Lelya") (2018)
 "Фантастична жiнка" ("Fantastic woman") (2018)
 "Очі" ("Eyes") (2019)
 "Як плакала вона" ("How she cried") (2019)
 "Мурашки" ("Creepy") (2019)
 "Ейфорія" ("Euphoria") (2020)
 "Жіноча cила" ("Female strength") (2020)
 "Плачу і сміюся" ("I cry and laugh") (2020)
 "Вийди на свiтло" ("Come to light") (2020)
 "100 днiв" ("100 days") (2020)

References

External links

Living people
1984 births
English-language singers from Ukraine
Actors from Chernivtsi
Ukrainian pop singers
Ukrainian singer-songwriters
21st-century Ukrainian women singers
Ukrainian LGBT rights activists
The Voice of Ukraine contestants
Musicians from Chernivtsi